Candidula rhabdotoides is a species of air-breathing land snail, a terrestrial pulmonate gastropod mollusk in the family Geomitridae, the hairy snails and their allies.

Distribution

This species occurs in Bulgaria.

References

 Wagner, A. J. (1928). Studien zur Molluskenfauna der Balkanhalbinsel mit besonderer Berücksichtigung Bulgariens und Thraziens, nebst monographischer Bearbeitung einzelner Gruppen. Prace Zoologiczne Polskiego Panstwowego Muzeum Przyrodniczego [Annales Zoologici Musei Polonici Historiae Naturalis]. 6 (4): 263-399, pl. 10-23. Warszawa.
 Bank, R. A.; Neubert, E. (2017). Checklist of the land and freshwater Gastropoda of Europe. Last update: July 16th, 2017
 Hausdorf, B. (1991). Über zwei Candidula-Arten von der südlichen Balkanhalbinsel (Gastropoda: Hygromiidae). Archiv für Molluskenkunde, 120 (4/6): 119-129. Frankfurt am Main.

rhabdotoides
Gastropods described in 1928